Vlastimil Bubník (18 March 1931 – 6 January 2015) was a Czech ice hockey player and footballer.

Bubník was born in Kelč, Czechoslovakia, and played in the Czechoslovak Extraliga. He played for HC Brno and Královo Pole. He also won a bronze medal at the 1964 Winter Olympics. He was inducted into the International Ice Hockey Federation Hall of Fame in 1997.

He was tied with Canada's Harry Watson and Soviet Union's Valeri Kharlamov for the all-time Olympic scoring lead, until he was surpassed by Finland's Teemu Selänne in the 2010 Winter Olympics

During his football career he played for RH Brno. Over nine seasons in the Czechoslovak First League, he made 103 appearances, scoring 32 goals. He also scored 40 goals in five seasons in the second level. He earned 11 caps and scored 4 goals for the Czechoslovakia national football team from 1957 to 1960, and participated in the 1960 European Nations' Cup. He died in 2015.

References

External links

Football profile

1931 births
1960 European Nations' Cup players
2015 deaths
Association football forwards
Czech footballers
Czechoslovak footballers
Czechoslovakia international footballers
Ice hockey players at the 1952 Winter Olympics
Ice hockey players at the 1956 Winter Olympics
Ice hockey players at the 1960 Winter Olympics
Ice hockey players at the 1964 Winter Olympics
IIHF Hall of Fame inductees
Medalists at the 1964 Winter Olympics
Olympic bronze medalists for Czechoslovakia
Olympic ice hockey players of Czechoslovakia
Olympic medalists in ice hockey
People from Kelč
Sportspeople from the Zlín Region
Czechoslovak ice hockey forwards
Czech ice hockey forwards
Czechoslovak expatriate sportspeople in Yugoslavia
Czechoslovak expatriate sportspeople in Austria
Czechoslovak expatriate ice hockey people
Czech ice hockey coaches
Czechoslovak ice hockey coaches